The Gate of Glorious Harmony (Manchu:  ijishūn hūwaliyambure duka), or the Gate of Xihe, Xihemen is a gate sits on the central road of the outer court of the Forbidden Palace. It is on the outer side of the Gate of Supreme Harmony, and eastern to the Gate of Blending Harmony It was first built on the 18th year of Yongle (1420) and was named Gate of Right Obedience. The current building is built on the 23rd year of Qianlong (1758).

References

External links

 

Buildings and structures in Beijing
Forbidden City